SYM-2081 is a highly selective agonist for the kainate receptor. This potent agonist has nearly 3,000 fold- and 200-fold selectivity for kainate receptors over AMPA and NMDA receptors, respectively. Given its potency and selectivity, it is a useful ligand for studying the role of kainate receptors in the central nervous system.

Synthesis 

SYM-2081 can be prepared through diastereomeric mixture via enzymatic synthesis, but the yield of this reaction is small. SYM-2081 can be produced at a multi-gram scale by starting with (S)-1-t-butoxycarbonyl-5-t-butyldiphenylsilyoxymethylpyrrolidine-2-one and treating it with one equivalent of lithium bis(trimethylsilyl)amide in tetrahydrofuran (THF) at -78 °C. The resulting product was mixed with excess iodomethane which yielded 4-methylated products and some unreacted starting material. The trans product was purified through column chromatography. Next, the product was crystallized by hexanes. Tetrabutylammonium fluoride was used for its primary alcohol to selectively remove the tert-butyldiphenylsilyl (TBDPS) protecting group. The Sharpless procedure was used to oxidize the alcohol. This intermediate was hydrolyzed with lithium hydroxide in aqueous THF. Finally, the compound was treated with trifluoroacetic acid (TFA) in dichloromethane to produce (2S,4R)-4-methylglutamic acid.

Research 
Some research has indicated that having the methyl group in SYM-2081 is essential for its potency. SYM-2081 was 20 times more potent than its (2R,4R) isomer and 1000 times more potent than its (2S,4S) isomer.

References 

Amino acid derivatives
Dicarboxylic acids